The Iowa Review is an American literary magazine that publishes fiction, poetry, essays, and reviews.

History and profile
Founded in 1970, Iowa Review is issued three times a year, during the months of April, August, and December. Originally, it was released on a quarterly basis. This frequency of publication lasted until its fourteenth year. It is published at The University of Iowa in Iowa City. According to former editor David Hamilton, The Iowa Review has a circulation of about 3,000, of which 1,000-1,500 are distributed to major bookstore chains.

The reading period for unsolicited submissions occurs between August and October in fiction and poetry and August and November in nonfiction, whereas contest submissions for the Iowa Review Awards are read in January.  In addition to space dedicated in the December issue to the Iowa Review Awards winners, the magazine has recently featured work from The University of Iowa's biannual NonfictioNow conference and from writers in The University of Iowa's International Writing Program. Past issues have also been dedicated to topics such as fiction from Israel and Palestine (11.1), contemporary women writers (12.2/3), and an homage to Ezra Pound (15.1). According to the magazine's website, "We select most of our content from the several thousand unsolicited manuscripts that arrive each year from throughout the country and abroad." Several of these pieces are selected each year for awards and anthologies: recent selections include Susan Perabo's short story "Shelter" (39.1) for The Pushcart Prize XXXV: Best of the Small Presses, 2011 edition, Eula Biss's essay "Time and Distance Overcome" (38.1) and Carolyne Wright's poem "This dream the world is having about itself..." (38.2) for The Pushcart Prize XXXIV: Best of the Small Presses, 2010 edition; Patricia Hampl's essay "The Dark Art of Description" (38.1), selected by Mary Oliver for The Best American Essays 2009; and Stephen Dunn's "Where He Found Himself" (36.2), in Best American Poetry 2007.

Masthead
As of Winter 2020/21:
Editor: Lynne Nugent
Managing editor: Katie Berta
Fiction editor: Joan Li
Nonfiction editor: Darius Stewart
Poetry editor: Abagail Petersen
Type composition: Pocket Knife Press
Fulfillment manager: Corey Campbell
Interns: Elsa Richardson-Bach, Nicholas Runyon, Olivia Tonelli
Editorial board: Aron Aji, Charles D'Ambrosio, Melissa Febos, Lois Geist, Loren Glass, Allison Means, Christopher Merrill, Roland Racevskis, Lisa Schlesinger, Jan Weissmiller
Editor emeritus: David Hamilton

Distinguished past contributors
Jacob Appel, 38.3
John Ashbery: 6.1, 12.1
John Barth: 24.2
Jo Ann Beard: 25.2
Samuel Beckett: 4.3
Marvin Bell: 2.3, 6.3/4, 7.4, 11.2/3, 12.1, 14.3, 19.3, 23.3, 26.2, 28.2, 30.2, 34.3, 36.3
Robert Bly: 7.4, 11.2/3
Jorge Luis Borges: 8.3, 22.3
Marianne Boruch: 10.4, 13.3/4, 17.2, 17.3, 20.1, 22.1, 23.2, 25.1, 25.3, 26.2, 29.3, 33.2, 37.3
T. Coraghessan Boyle: 11.4, 14.1
Joseph Brodsky: 9.4
William S. Burroughs: 3.2
Frederick Busch: 9.1, 16.2, 18.2
Italo Calvino: 2.4
Anne Carson: 25.2, 26.2, 27.2
Raymond Carver: 3.2, 3.4, 9.1, 10.3
Jane Cooper: 20.2
Robert Coover: 1.1, 1.4, 6.3/4, 10.3, 24.2, 35.2
Robert Dana: 26.1, 26.2, 28.2, 32.2, 34.3, 37.1, 38.1
Guy Davenport: 6.1
Mark Doty: 14.3
Norman Dubie: 4.4
James Galvin: 9.1, 10.2, 15.1, 24.1
William Gass: 7.1, 24.2, 38.1
Reginald Gibbons: 8.4, 15.1
Louise Glück: 2.4, 4.4, 7.4
Albert Goldbarth: 22.3, 24.1, 25.2, 27.2, 29.1, 30.3, 34.2, 39.1
Jorie Graham: 10.2, 11.2/3, 12.2/3, 26.2
Donald Hall: 3.3, 7.4, 13.3/4, 16.2, 18.1, 20.1, 22.3, 26.1, 30.2, 34.2
Robert Hass: 8.3, 21.3
Seamus Heaney: 26.3
Bob Hicok: 26.3, 38.2, 32.1, 33.3, 35.3, 37.3
Edward Hirsch: 9.3
Denis Johnson: 1.2, 2.2, 2.3, 5.4, 6.3/4, 8.3, 13.2
Donald Justice: 1.1, 2.1, 13.3/4, 15.2
Stanley Kunitz: 5.2
Li-Young Lee: 15.1
Philip Levine: 1.1, 1.2, 2.2, 4.3, 6.1, 7.1, 9.2, 15.1
Yiyun Li: 34.2
Ben Marcus: 24.2
Ian McEwan: 8.4
James Alan McPherson: 6.2, 23.3, 27.2
Jane Mead: 21.3, 29.1, 33.3
W.S. Merwin: 1.2, 1.4, 2.2, 6.1, 7.1, 13.1, 14.3, 15.2, 17.1
Nami Mun: 34.2
Joyce Carol Oates: 2.2, 6.1, 9.3, 13.2, 14.3, 17.1
Chris Offutt: 33.1, 41.3
Eric Pankey: 17.3, 19.2, 21.3, 25.3, 27.2, 29.2, 32.3, 34.1, 36.2, 38.1
Ann Patchett: 18.2
Raymond R. Patterson: 6.2
Stanley Plumly: 8.1, 11.2/3, 20.3
Ishmael Reed: 6.2
Marilynne Robinson: 22.1
Pattiann Rogers: 14.3, 17.2, 23.1, 25.1, 26.2, 29.1, 39.1
Matthew Rohrer: 25.1, 26.2, 27.2, 28.3, 32.1, 34.2, 37.3
Mary Ruefle: 18.3, 38.1
Tomaž Šalamun: 34.1, 38.2
David Shapiro: 10.1
Charles Simic: 1.4, 5.4, 9.2, 15.1, 32.2
Floyd Skloot: 29.1
Gary Soto: 25.1, 25.2
Gerald Stern: 9.2, 11.2/3, 11.4, 15.1, 19.2, 26.2, 35.2
Cole Swensen: 32.1, 42.3
James Tate: 1.4, 4.4, 13.3/4, 20.2, 24.3, 26.2, 30.3
Kurt Vonnegut: 35.3
Alice Walker: 6.2
David Foster Wallace: 24.2, 24.3
William Carlos Williams: 9.3
Charles Wright: 1.3, 3.2, 7.1, 8.1, 11.2/3, 26.2, 34.3
Al Young: 6.2
Dean Young: 17.2, 29.2

Iowa Review Awards
Each year, beginning with 2003 (33.3), the magazine presents the Iowa Review Award to contest winners in fiction, poetry, and literary nonfiction. Outside judges name the winners, who each receive $1,500 and are published, along with some finalists, in the magazine's December issue. Recent winners include Terrance Manning, Jr. (Nonfiction, 2017), Catherine Cafferty (Poetry, 2017), and Laura Kolbe (Fiction, 2017). 
Past judges:
2003- T. Coraghessan Boyle, fiction; Albert Goldbarth, nonfiction; Marilyn Chin, poetry
2004- Mary Helen Stefaniak, fiction; Lewis Hyde, nonfiction; Marianne Boruch, poetry
2005- Chris Offutt, fiction; Patricia Foster, nonfiction; Robert Hass, poetry
2006- James Alan McPherson, fiction; Lia Purpura, nonfiction; Cole Swensen, poetry
2007- Yiyun Li, fiction; Phillip Lopate, nonfiction; Bob Hicok, poetry
2008- Ethan Canin, fiction; Abigail Thomas, nonfiction; Heather McHugh, poetry
2009- Ann Patchett, fiction; John D'Agata, nonfiction; Li-Young Lee, poetry
2010- Michael Cunningham, fiction; Jo Ann Beard, nonfiction; Brenda Hillman, poetry
2011- Allan Gurganus, fiction; Patricia Hampl, nonfiction; Claudia Rankine, poetry
2012- Ron Currie Jr., fiction; Meghan Daum, nonfiction; Timothy Donnelly, poetry
2013- ZZ Packer, fiction; Susan Orlean, nonfiction; Mary Jo Bang, poetry
2014- Rachel Kushner, fiction; David Shields, nonfiction; Robyn Schiff, poetry
2015- Kevin Brockmeier, fiction; Wayne Koestenbaum, nonfiction; Srikanth Reddy, poetry
2016- Kelly Link, fiction; Eula Biss, nonfiction; Brenda Shaughnessy, poetry
2017- Amelia Gray, fiction; Charles D'Ambrosio, nonfiction; Joyelle McSweeney, poetry
2018- Alexander Chee, fiction; Kiese Laymon, nonfiction; Elizabeth Willis, poetry
2019- Rebecca Makkai, fiction; Roxane Gay, nonfiction; Kiki Petrosino, poetry
2020- Lan Samantha Chang, fiction; Leslie Jamison, nonfiction; Stephanie Burt, poetry

See also
List of literary magazines

Notes

External links

1970 establishments in Iowa
Literary magazines published in the United States
Magazines established in 1970
Triannual magazines published in the United States
University of Iowa
Quarterly magazines published in the United States
Magazines published in Iowa